This is a list of operation carried out by the Brigade of Gurkhas (United Kingdom), Gurkha Contingent (Singapore), Gorkha regiments (India) and other Gurkha armies but not by the Nepal Army.

Asia

First Anglo-Sikh War (India, 1846)

After the Anglo-Gorkha war a conflict arose between the British and Punjab. Both wanted to avoid conflict. However, after the death of Ranjit Singh, the ruler of Punjab, the Sikh  army fought wars against the British. In 1845 the Sikhs invaded the British territory at Satluj.

In December 1846, an inconclusive battle was fought at Ferozeshah, and in January 1846, Sikh attempted to cut the British lines of communication. To counteract, the combined force of British, Indian and Gurkha were sent to intercept the Sikhs. The Sikhs were forced to retreat. In the next month, a final battle was fought at Sobraon. Gurkha reinforcements from the Sirmoor and Nasiri Battalions took part in the battle. Sikh army surrendered and peace agreement was reached in early March 1846.

Siege of Delhi (India, 1857)
Siege of Delhi took place in June–September 1857. The troops from the British East India Company who had grievances against the British officers came to Delhi. To suppress the revolt, the antecedents of the modern Brigade of Gurkhas were called.  After Delhi was recaptured, Queen's Truncheon was awarded to the battalion. Forces of the Nepalese Army also fought during the aggression that was sent by Jang Bahadur Rana to assist the British.

Second Anglo-Afghan War (Afghanistan ,1878-1880)

The battalion of 2nd Gurkhas rifles fought in the northern village against the Afgans. After the war, Afghanistan came firmly under British influence.

Boxer rebellion (China, 1900)
The Gurkhas fought against Chinese forces in the Boxer Rebellion to suppress the uprising against foreign influence in China.

Third Anglo-Afghan War (Afghanistan, 1919)
 British Indian government declared war upon Afghanistan on 6 May 1919. Gurkhas and Sikhs were sent to Landi Kotal for reinforcement.

Anglo-Iraqi War (Iraq, 1941)

On 18 April 1941, the 20th Indian Infantry Brigade landed at Basra with the 2nd battalion 8th Gurkha Rifles, 2nd battalion 7th Gurkha Rifles, and the 3rd battalion 11th Sikh Regiment. They fought at various cities in Iraq.

Battle of Jitra (Malaysia, 1941)

In 1941 Gurkha army was involved in battle against Japanese in Malaysia. The battle was lost, and all armies were transferred to Singapore.

Battle of Wadi Akarit (Tunisia, 1943)
The Battle of Wadi Akarit took place on April 5 and 6, 1943 at Wadi Akarit in Tunisia. The purpose of the battle was to assist the Allied forces. Gurkha army took part in the battle under the 4th Indian Division. Lalbahadur Thapa got VC in the battle for making a night assault at the Fatnassa heights.

Battle of Imphal (India, 1944)
Battle of Imphal was fought in Northern India in the region around the city of Imphal, the capital of the state of Manipur. The battle occurred from 12 March to 21 June 1944 between the British force and Japanese forces. Three battalions of 10th Princess Mary's Own Gurkha Rifles were involved in the battle. 184 were dead and 820 were wounded. The honour of IMPHAL was awarded to Royal Gurkha Rifles antecedent Regiment after the battle.

Brunei revolt (Brunei, 1962-1966)
The first battalion of 2nd KEO Gurkha Rifles were the first armed force used against the Brunei Revolt in December 1962. The troop was send to Brunei in December by air dropping. The Gurkhas fought against the Indonesian Regular Army in Sabah and Sarawak. The operation took four years in total. The campaign ended in 1966. In November 1965 that Rambahadur Limbu got Victoria Cross in the battle for attempting to rescue two wounded comrades.

Battle of Sylhet (East Pakistan, 1971)
In 1971, 4/5 Gorkha Rifles from Indian army took part in the Battle of Sylhet in East Pakistan (currently Bangladesh) against the Pakistani brigades. The operation lead to the surrender of the Pakistani brigades on 16 December 1971.

Sri Lanka peacekeeping operation (Sri Lanka, 1987-1990)
On 1 October 1987, the 4/5 Gorkha Rifles from Indian Army were deployed as peace keeper to Sri Lanka. However, there they had to fight against the rebels. The Gurkha army firstly rescued the 13 Sikh Light Infantry and a team of 10 para-commando. After the rescue operation, LTTE attacked Gurkha army and the long battle started. The operation continued up to 1990. During the period, the Indian army supplied arms to local Tamils to fight against LTTE and a portion of Gurkha army were appointed to train them. Due to substantial damage, the Indian army had to retreat from the operation bringing back the Gurkha army from Sri Lanka. Prem Thapa was awarded Param Vir Chakra for leading the troop after the death of his superiors in one of the battle.

South America

Falklands War (Argentina, 1982) 
The Falklands War was fought in Argentina in 1982. On 2 April 1982, Argentinian troops invaded The Falkland Islands which was controlled by the British Government. In response, a naval task force sailed on to the island. In the battle, Gurkhas were to take Mount William. The Argentine artillery aggression caused several injuries amongst the Gurkhas. All Argentine forces on the Falklands surrendered at the end of war.

Africa

North Africa (Arabia, 1943)
Gurkha forces fought in Arabia in North Africa attacking Turkish soldiers. Gurkhas were sent to hold the critical port of Tubrik when it fell they became German prisoners where they faced loss.  The remaining soldier were sent to mountain area to hold the Germans. After the battle, Rommal's Africa Corps surrendered.

Europe

Italy campaign (Italy, 1944)
The Gurkha army were sent to Italy in May 1943, to prevent the Germans from advancing. Italy had surrendered when the allied troops had invaded, but the German soldiers remained in mountains of Italy.  The Gurkhas reached Italy on 11 February 1944 as a part of the 4th Indian Division. They started an offence on February 16 and 17. Both attacks were a failure causing 20% casualties. On May 14 the Polish Division finally took the position.  During the period, the Gurkhas managed to take several mountains while losing 4,000 men.

Kosovo operation (Kosovo, 1999)

The British Gurkhas disarmed 70 fighters of the Kosovo Liberation Army in a raid commanded by NATO. The Gurkha troops counteracted after fighters of Kosovo Liberation Army started shooting at in the Kacanik area. After the operation, the Kosovian fighters surrendered with their weapons.

References

Brigade of Gurkhas
Gurkhas